Hjalmar is a Scandinavian male given name, from Old Norse Hjálmarr.

People with the given name Hjalmar 
Hjalmar Andersen (1923–2013), Norwegian speed skater
Hjalmar Bergman (1883–1931), Swedish author
Hjalmar Branting (1860–1925), prime minister of Sweden
Hjalmar Dahl (1891–1960), Finnish journalist, translator and writer
Hjalmar Gullberg (1898–1961), Swedish poet
Hjalmar Fries (1891–1973), Norwegian actor
Hjalmar Frisell (1880–1967), Swedish military officer
Hjalmar Frisk (1900–1984), Swedish linguist
Hjalmar Johansen (1867–1913), Norwegian polar explorer
Hjalmar Mäe (1901–1978), Estonian politician
Hjalmar Mehr (1910–1979), Swedish politician
Hjalmar Mellin (1854–1933), Finnish mathematician
Hjalmar Carl Nygaard (1906–1963), U.S. Representative from North Dakota
Hjalmar Nygaard (boxer) (1900–1936), Norwegian boxer
Hjalmar Petersen (1890–1968), American politician
Hjalmar Peterson, Swedish singer and comedian
Hjalmar Schacht (1877–1970), President of the Reichsbank in the Weimar Republic
Hjalmar Söderberg (1869–1941), Swedish author
Hjalmar von Sydow (1862–1932), Swedish lawyer and politician
Hjalmar Welhaven (1850–1922), Norwegian architect
Hjalmar Åström (1888–1957), Swedish lieutenant general

Hjalmar may also refer to:
Hjalmar and Ingeborg, a legendary Swedish couple
Hjálmar, an Icelandic reggae band

Notes

See also 
 Djalma, Portuguese variation
 Helmer (disambiguation)

Masculine given names
Scandinavian masculine given names
Norwegian masculine given names
Swedish masculine given names